In economics, concentration ratios are used to quantify market concentration and are based on companies' market shares in a given industry. Market share can be defined as a firm's proportion of total sales in an industry, a firm's market capitalisation as a percentage of total industry market capitalisation or any other metric which conveys the size and dominance of a company relative to its competitors. A concentration ratio (CR) is the sum of the percentage market shares of (a pre-specified number of) the largest firms in an industry. An n-firm concentration ratio is a common measure of market structure and shows the combined market share of the n largest firms in the market. For example, where n = 5, CR5 defines the combined market share of the five largest firms in an industry.  

Competition economists and competition authorities typically employ concentration ratios (CRn) and the Herfindahl-Hirschman Index (HHI) as measures of market concentration. The concentration of firms in an industry is of interest to economists, business strategists and government agencies.

Calculation 
The concentration ratio is calculated as follows: CRn = C1 + C2 + ... + Cn 

Where:

Cn  defines the market share of the nth largest firm in an industry as a percentage of total industry market share

n    defines the number of firms included in the concentration ratio calculation

The CR4 and CR8 concentration ratios are commonly used. Concentration ratios show the extent of largest firms' market shares in a given industry. Specifically, a concentration ratio close to 0% is indicative of a low concentration industry and a concentration ratio near 100% suggests an industry has high concentration.

Concentration levels 
Concentration ratios range from 0%–100%. Concentration levels are explained as follows:

Benefits and shortfalls 
Given that information around market size and firm market shares are readily available, concentration ratios are simplistic in nature and are able to quantify market concentration in a given industry, in a relevant and succinct manner. In contrast, the definition of the concentration ratio does not use the market shares of all the firms in the industry and does not account for the distribution of firm size. Also, it does not provide much detail about competitiveness of an industry. The concentration ratios provides a sign of the oligopolistic nature of an industry.  The following example exposes the aforementioned shortfalls of the concentration ratio.

Example 
The table below shows the market shares of the largest firms in two separate industries (Industry A and Industry B). Aside from the tabulated market shares for Industry A and Industry B, both industries are the same in terms of the number of firms operating in the industry and their respective market shares.

Based on the table above, it is evident that Industry B is more concentrated than Industry A since the market share is distributed more heavily towards the more dominant firms. However, Industry A and Industry B both have CR4 ratios of 80%. This example shows that the CR ratio does not take in to account the distribution of market share amongst the most dominant firms. In the following section, an alternative measure of market concentration addresses these shortfalls.

Alternative market concentration measure 
The Herfindahl-Hirschman Index (HHI) provides a more complete picture of industry concentration than the concentration ratio does. The HHI avoids the problem that concentration ratios do not reflect changes in the size of the largest firms. 

The HHI is calculated as follows: HHI = C12 + C22 + ... + Cn2 

Where:

Cn  defines the market share of the nth largest firm in an industry as a percentage of total industry market share

Using the example in the benefits and shortfalls section above, Industry A has a lower HHI than Industry B. As compared with the concentration ratio, the HHI metric is able to capture the greater concentration in Industry B via the more complex method of calculation. Logically, the HHI may be considered a better measure for market concentration as it is able to more accurately describe the concentration of a given industry.

Notes

References
German
Christoph Lang: Marktmacht und Marktmachtmessung im deutschen Großhandelsmarkt für Strom, Deutscher Universitätsverlag/GWF Fachverlag Gmbh, Wiesbaden 2007

English
London economics in association with global energy decisions: Structure and Performance of Six European Wholesale Electricity Markets in 2003, 2004 and 2005, presented to DG Comp 26 February 2007
Industry Concentration
Concentration Ratios
National Statistics Economic Trends: Concentration Ratios 2004

See also 
Market form
Herfindahl index
Microeconomics
Market dominance strategies
N50 statistic

Concentration indicators
Imperfect competition
Monopoly (economics)
Ratios